Fridrihs Bošs (7 February 1887 – 12 February 1950) was a cyclist. He competed in two events at the 1912 Summer Olympics for the Russian Empire.

References

External links
 

1887 births
1950 deaths
Olympic competitors for the Russian Empire
Cyclists at the 1912 Summer Olympics
People from Valmiera